Oskar Sewerzyński (born 12 August 2001) is a Polish professional footballer who plays as a midfielder for Chrobry Głogów, on loan from Korona Kielce.

Club career
On 11 September 2020, he joined Pogoń Siedlce on a season-long loan.

References

2001 births
Sportspeople from Kielce
Living people
Polish footballers
Association football midfielders
Korona Kielce players
MKP Pogoń Siedlce players
Chrobry Głogów players
Ekstraklasa players
I liga players
II liga players
III liga players